CALD may refer to:

 Cambridge Advanced Learner's Dictionary
 Council of Asian Liberals and Democrats
 Council of Australian Law Deans
 Culturally and linguistically diverse, a term used in policy discourse related to multiculturalism in Australia
 former NASDAQ symbol between 2000 and 2001 of Caldera Systems, Inc.
 former NASDAQ symbol between 2001 and 2001 of  Caldera International, Inc.
 NASDAQ symbol since 2003 of CallidusCloud

See also
 Caldesmon, protein encoded by the CALD1 gene